Live from Dakota is the first live album by Welsh rock band Stereophonics. It is a 2-disc compilation featuring 20 tracks spanning the first five of the band's albums and capturing the best of their 2005 world tour. Rather than being a recording of single show, every night of the tour was recorded and the band picked out the best version of each song individually. The album title is therefore not literal, but references the name of their first UK number one single. In the UK it was released on V2, whereas the American release it was released on Vox Populi Records, the band's own imprint label. The album was rereleased on 13 April 2019 as part of Record Store Day.

Track listing
All lyrics by Kelly Jones.

Personnel 

Stereophonics
 Kelly Jones – vocals, guitar
 Richard Jones – bass guitar
 Javier Weyler – drums

Touring musicians
 Tony Kirkham – keyboard

Technical
 Recording – Steve McNichol
 Production – Kelly Jones, Jim Lowe
 Engineering – Steve McNichol
 Mixing – Jim Lowe, Stereophonics
 Mastering – Dick Beetham

Charts and certifications

Charts

Certifications

References

External links
 Live from Dakota at Stereophonics.com

Stereophonics albums
2006 live albums
V2 Records live albums